LIU Post (formally, the C.W. Post Campus of Long Island University, and often referred to as C.W. Post) is a private university in Brookville, New York. It is the largest campus of the private Long Island University system.

The campus is named after breakfast cereal inventor Charles William Post, father of Marjorie Merriweather Post, who sold the property (which had been her Long Island estate known as Hillwood) to LIU in 1951 for $200,000 ($ today).  Three years after it acquired the property, LIU renamed it C.W. Post College in honor of Post's father.

Campus 

The area is sometimes datelined as Greenvale, because there is no "Brookville" post office, and the school is in the zip code that is served by the Greenvale post office, which is to the west. "Greenvale" is also the name of the nearest Long Island Rail Road station.

Humanities Hall and Life Sciences/Pell Hall are the main educational buildings on campus, and house most of the core curriculum classes. Classes are also held in Hoxie Hall, Roth Hall, Lorber Hall, the Theater Film and Dance building, Sculpture Studio, Crafts Center, Fine Arts Center, B. Davis Schwartz Memorial Library, and the Kahn Discovery Center.

Kumble Hall serves as the Student Services building and houses the Registrar, Bursar, Records and Registration, Financial Aid, Academic Counseling, and Professional Experience and Career Planning (PEP) offices.

The Tilles Center for the Performing Arts is on the west side of the campus. Previously known as the Bush-Brown Concert Theater (named for the longtime Long Island University chancellor Dr. Albert Bush-Brown), the Tilles Center has hosted many musical and theatrical events.

The Hillwood Commons serves as the student activities center, and also has several administrative offices. Hillwood has a study lounge, commuter lounge, recreation lounge, and TV lounge (located on opposite sides of the two-story building) that are open as long as Hillwood is open. The Hillwood Cafe, Subway, and Starbucks are all located here, and serve as the main dining areas, along with the Winnick Student Center.

The Hillwood Commons serves as a meeting area for resident and commuter students to get to know each other through informal association outside of the classroom. The Hillwood Commons area also houses the Student Technology Center, Hillwood Computer Lab, Hillwood Cinema, and Steinberg Museum of Art at Hillwood.

The university's landmark C. W. Post Interfaith Chapel is the home of the Interfaith Center which provides both religious services as well as partnerships with community organizations. The chapel was first conceived in 1968 by Bradley Delehanty and completed by the noted Long Island architectural firm Alfred Shaknis and Peter S. van Bloem in the classic Jeffersonian style Georgian architecture design as a tribute to all religious faiths. Included among its notable architectural features are a domed rotunda at the main sanctuary, as well as soaring Doric columns at the main entrance which call to mind the ancient Roman Pantheon.<ref>[http://wikimapia.org/#lang=en&lat=40.820140&lon=-73.591669&z=19&m=w&show=/34012513/C-W-Post-Interfaith-Chapel C. W. Post Interfaith Chapel on Wikimapia.org]</ref>

 Residence life 

Students may live in one of the eight residence halls on campus. All are co-ed, with males and females divided by floor or wing. Each hall accommodates from 40 to 380 students. Five of the residence halls – Brookville, Kings, Queens, Post and Riggs – offer traditional-style living.

The South Residence Complex (Suites) features an all-suite design, with up to eight students sharing a common living area, double bedrooms and a semi-private bath area. This layout is popular with upper-class students who want to share living accommodations with a group of friends.

Suffolk and Nassau offer more specialized options. Suffolk Hall is a traditional-style hall designed for 24-hour intensified study for students who prefer a quiet, academic-centered environment. Nassau Hall offers the additional benefit of long-stay accommodations over vacations and in between semesters for students who are from out of state.

Every residence hall has lounges for relaxation or study, as well as laundry facilities.

Many of the dorms have been criticized as being poorly maintained by students in The Pioneer, the weekly campus newspaper. In 2007, a dorm room in Riggs Hall was completely scorched by an electrical fire. The students were not in the room at the time, but their belongings were destroyed. The school claimed no responsibility although the residents told the student newspaper they had complained about black outlets shortly before the fire.

In 2006 CW Post Residence Life was sued for dismissing a group of RAs for making a video exercising their freedom of speech. The students obtained a lawyer and the university agreed to pay their legal fees if the students dropped the lawsuit and signed a non-disclosure contract.

 Academics 

LIU Post offers undergraduate and graduate programs in the following colleges and schools:

 College of Communications, Art, and Design
 College of Liberal Arts and Sciences
 College of Management
 College of Education, Information and Technology
 School of Health Professions and Nursing

 Rebranding campaign 

On January 1, 2012, Long Island University rebranded itself as LIU. A simplified logo was introduced, replacing the Long Island map and the words "Long Island University" with the bold letters "LIU" and a triangle. The logo's upward triangle, the Greek symbol of delta, symbolizes upward movement and change. The names of LIU's six campuses also received shorter designations, uniting them under the new LIU brand. The C.W. Post Campus of Long Island University became known as LIU Post.

 Accreditations 
The academic programs of LIU Post are registered with the New York State Education Department and accredited by the Commission of Higher Education of the Middle States Association of Colleges and Secondary Schools. In addition to the entire university, various other academic programs are specially accredited by professional organizations. Organizations that professionally accredit LIU Post programs are:

 
 AACSB International – The Association to Advance Collegiate Schools of Business
 American Art Therapy Association
 American Library Association
 American Psychological Association
 American Speech-Language-Hearing Association
 Commission on Accreditation for Dietetics Education, American Dietetic Association
 Commission on Accreditation of Allied Health Education Programs (in cooperation with the Council on Accreditation of the American Health Information Management Association [AHIMA])
 Commission on Collegiate Nursing Education
 Council for Accreditation of Counseling and Related Educational Programs
 Council on Social Work Education
 Joint Review Committee on Education in Radiologic Technology
 National Accrediting Agency for Clinical Laboratory Sciences
 National Association of Schools of Public Affairs & Administration
 Teacher Education Accreditation Council

 Student life 

While on campus, students can join the many clubs, organizations, and student leadership positions. 
LIU Post has a diverse student body, with individuals of African-American and Latino descent making up the majority of the minority student population. The students come mostly from eastern Long Island, New York City, and the New York metropolitan area, although there is a significant number of students from across the U.S. and internationally.

Post is known for being quiet Friday through Sunday, and is sometimes referred to as a "suitcase school". Most residents leave during weekends, or on Thursday nights since there are very few Friday classes. Although weekends have been more active since Southampton College moved its undergraduate program to LIU Post, there is still a significant difference in the campus population on weekends. A good percentage of students attend parties at local clubs, many of which begin on Thursday night. Others travel to New York City or elsewhere on Long Island.

There are several fraternities and sororities students can join at LIU Post.

 Athletics 

Long Island University competes in NCAA Division I as the LIU Sharks. Before 2019, LIU Post was a Division II school that is governed by the National Collegiate Athletic Association (NCAA), the Eastern College Athletic Conference (ECAC), the East Coast Conference (ECC), and the Northeast-10 Conference (NE-10). Prior to 2019, the two LIU campuses had separate athletics teams: C.W. Post had the LIU Post Pioneers and competed in Division II, and the other LIU campus in Brooklyn fielded the Division I Blackbirds. On July 1, 2019, the two campuses merged their two athletics teams into a single unit competing in Division I, henceforth known as the Sharks.

Students may also participate in sports for leisure at the Pratt Recreation Center, where they can enjoy sports such as basketball, volleyball, racquetball, and swimming. There is also a fitness center for aerobic and cardiovascular workouts. The athletic fields and courts serve students wishing to play outdoor sports such as football, baseball, soccer, softball and tennis.

The Pratt Center is also a venue for Nassau County and New York State high school basketball playoff games, both men's and women's, along with the Clark Center at the State University of New York College at Old Westbury.

 Notable faculty 
 T. K. Blue, leader of the jazz band
 Bob Brier, Egyptologist and mummy specialist
 Paul Kim, music theory, history, and keyboard teacher; piano recording artist

 Notable alumni 
 A.J. Benza, TV show host and actor (Celebrity Fit Club)
 Frank Catalanotto, '96; former Major League Baseball outfielder
 Dave Cohen, '88; final head college football coach for Hofstra University
 Ray Dalio, founder of Bridgewater Associates investment firm
 Ted David, CNBC anchor
 Janet DiFiore, former Chief Judge of the New York Court of Appeals
 Mike Gange, of The Howard Stern Show Joe Gatto, comedian, executive producer of Impractical Jokers Charles J. Gradante, hedge fund expert
 Alan Hahn, MSG Network studio analyst, co-host of daily ESPN Radio sports talk show
 Jackee Harry, actress
 Bunny Hoest, cartoonist of The Lockhorns'' comic strip
 Al Kahn, former chairman and CEO of 4Kids Entertainment and university board member
 Jamie Kellner, chairman and CEO of Turner Broadcasting System
 Brian Kilmeade, Fox News Channel television personality
 Perry Klein (born 1971), American football quarterback in the National Football League; played for the Atlanta Falcons
 Ed Lauter, actor
 John Leguizamo, actor
 Bruce Lipton, developmental biologist
 Lynda Lopez, anchorwoman
 Howard Lorber, chief executive officer of Nathan's Famous
 Dina Meyer, actress
 Jorge M. Pérez, billionaire Miami-based real estate developer
 Richie Scheinblum (1942–2021), Major League Baseball All-Star outfielder
 Terry Semel, chairman and CEO of Yahoo!
 Peter Senerchia, also known as Tazz in WWE; ECW wrestler and commentator
 Ronald Spadafora, FDNY chief
 Ralph V. Suozzi, mayor of Glen Cove, New York
 Michael Tucci, actor
 Larry Wachtel, the "Voice of Wall Street"; a senior vice president and market analyst at Prudential Securities, Inc., and respected financial markets commentator on WINS (AM) radio in New York City
 Gary Wichard, footballer and sports agent
 Gary Winnick, BS, '69; founder of Global Crossing Limited

References

External links 
 Official website
 Official athletics website

Post
Universities and colleges on Long Island
Mansions of Gold Coast, Long Island
Educational institutions established in 1954
Universities and colleges in Nassau County, New York
1954 establishments in New York (state)
East Coast Conference schools
Liberal arts colleges in New York (state)